Qbeta is a Sicilian musical group.

History 
Qbeta was formed in Solarino, from musicians from a wide variety of musical traditions.

Premi 
The band was awarded the Premio Sicilia il Paladino.

Discography

Qbeta (1993)
Arrivaru cuntraventu (1997)
Arrakkè (2000)
Indigeno (2004) with the sicilian songs: Hai comu, Kuturissi, Sovaiè, e Arrakkè.

External links
Official site
Qbeta in concert in Piazza Garibaldi (GuignoPisano.com)
Ognittanto i Qbeta a Catania (Step1)
Qbeta (Sound Magazine)
Qbeta: esce il singolo Faccio festa (saltinaria.it)

Musical groups from Sicily